The following highways are numbered 832:

United States